Joseph Conrad is an iron-hulled sailing ship, originally launched as Georg Stage in 1882 and used to train sailors in Denmark. After sailing around the world as a private yacht in 1934 she served as a training ship in the United States, and is now a museum ship at Mystic Seaport in Connecticut.

Service history

Late one night in 1905 in Copenhagen during a fireworks display over the harbor the ships crew were ordered to shut down the lights, and most of the crew went down to their bunks to sleep. A larger merchant ship came into the direction of the ship, now completely black due to no lights, and so, it crashed and filled the bunks where the boys were sleeping, killing 22 boys the ages of 14 to 17. The ship was raised afterward. It was on guard during WWI but was more of a merchant ship and not even moved from the harbor.

Australian sailor and author Alan Villiers saved Georg Stage from the scrappers and renamed the ship in honor of famed sea author Joseph Conrad. Villiers planned a circumnavigation with a crew of mostly boys. Joseph Conrad sailed from Ipswich on 22 October 1934, crossed the Atlantic Ocean to New York City, then down to Rio de Janeiro, Cape Town, and across the Indian Ocean and through the East Indies.

Villiers was bankrupted as a result of the expedition (although he did get three books out of the episode - Cruise of the Conrad, Stormalong, and Joey Goes to Sea), and sold the ship to Huntington Hartford, heir to the A&P supermarket fortune, who added an engine and used her as a yacht.

In 1939 Hartford donated Joseph Conrad to the United States Coast Guard for use as a training ship for the merchant marine based in Jacksonville, Florida.  She participated in a training cruise through the Caribbean beginning in December, 1939 and sailed in the St. Petersburg to Havana Yacht Race in early 1941, a few months before the United States entered World War II.  The Coast Guard turned the vessel over to the Maritime Administration when the merchant marine training functions of the Coast Guard were transferred to the newly created War Shipping Administration on September 1, 1942. Joseph Conrad continued to serve as a training ship until the war's end in 1945.

After being laid up for two years, the ship was transferred to Mystic Seaport in Stonington, Connecticut on July 9, 1947 for "museum and youth training purposes", where she has remained ever since as a floating exhibit.  In addition to her role as a museum, she is also a static training vessel and is employed by Mystic Seaport to house campers attending the Joseph Conrad Sailing Camp.

Awards
 American Defense Service Medal
 American Campaign Medal
 Merchant Marine Atlantic War Zone Medal
 World War II Victory Medal
 Merchant Marine World War II Victory Medal

References

External links 

 

Joseph Conrad
Museum ships in Mystic, Connecticut
Individual sailing vessels
Tall ships of Denmark
Tall ships of the United States
Sail training ships
1882 ships
Windjammers
Ships built in Copenhagen